Chapleau Cree First Nation (šaplo ininiwak) is a Mushkegowuk Cree First Nation located by Chapleau Township, Sudbury District, Ontario, Canada. The First Nation have reserved for themselves the  Chapleau 75 Indian Reserve and the  Chapleau Cree Fox Lake Indian Reserve. , their on-reserve population was 57 compared to 2011 with 79 and 2006 with 92.

Chapleau Cree First Nation is policed by the Nishnawbe-Aski Police Service, an Aboriginal-based service.

Governance
The First Nation is led by a Chief and five Councillors. Chapleau Cree First Nation is member of Mushkegowuk Council, a regional tribal council affiliated with the Nishnawbe Aski Nation.

References

External links
Wakenagun Community Futures Development Corporation profile

Communities in Sudbury District
Nishnawbe Aski Nation